Rector is a small unincorporated community in Ligonier Township, Westmoreland County, Pennsylvania, United States. Nearby attractions are Linn Run State Park and Flat Rock. As of 2000, the population of Rector was 600. Rector is composed of 26.4 miles2.

Linn Run State Park is on the outskirts of Rector.

Rector has no public school district, but the Valley School of Ligonier is in Rector.

References

Unincorporated communities in Westmoreland County, Pennsylvania
Unincorporated communities in Pennsylvania